USS Stromboli has been the name of three ships in the service of the United States Navy.  All have been named for the island of Stromboli in the Tyrrhenian Sea.
  was a brig originally named Howard, that was purchased by the Navy in 1846. She served during the Mexican–American War as part of the blockade fleet. She was decommissioned on 6 September 1848 and sold later that year.
  was the name briefly held by USS Wassuc, a monitor, in 1869.

United States Navy ship names